Herbert Arthur Carpenter (12 July 1869 – 12 December 1933) was an English first-class cricketer and umpire who played principally for Essex in a career which spanned from 1893 to 1920.

Cricket career
Carpenter came from a cricketing family and was the son of Cambridgeshire's Robert Carpenter. He made his Essex debut in 1888 and his consistent batting helped the county achieve first-class status in 1894. Carpenter scored 1000 runs in a season on six occasions. In 1900, he amassed 1468 runs including four centuries. His career at Essex spanned 26 years scoring 13,403 runs in 264 matches at an average of 29.50.

References

1869 births
1933 deaths
Cricketers from Cambridgeshire
Sportspeople from Cambridge
Essex cricketers
English cricketers of 1890 to 1918
Marylebone Cricket Club cricketers
Players cricketers
North v South cricketers
Cambridgeshire cricketers
English cricket umpires
Earl De La Warr's XI cricketers